The 2020–21 season was FC Desna Chernihiv's 61st season in existence and the club's third consecutive season in the top flight of Ukrainian football. In addition to the domestic league, Desna Chernihiv participated in this season's editions of the Ukrainian Cup and the UEFA Europa League. The season covers the period from August 2020 to 30 June 2021.

Players

Squad information

Transfers

In

Out

Pre-season and friendlies

Competitions

Overview

Ukrainian Premier League

League table

Results summary

Results by round

Matches

Ukrainian Cup

UEFA Europa League

Statistics

Appearances and goals

|-
! colspan=16 style=background:#dcdcdc; text-align:center| Goalkeepers

|-
! colspan=16 style=background:#dcdcdc; text-align:center| Defenders

|-
! colspan=16 style=background:#dcdcdc; text-align:center| Midfielders 

|-
! colspan=16 style=background:#dcdcdc; text-align:center| Forwards

|-
! colspan=16 style=background:#dcdcdc; text-align:center| Players transferred out during the season

 
Last updated: 9 May 2021

Goalscorers

Last updated: 9 May 2021

Clean sheets

Last updated: 9 May 2021

Disciplinary record

Last updated: 9 May 2021

Attendances

Last updated: 9 May 2021

References

External links

FC Desna Chernihiv
FC Desna Chernihiv seasons
Desna Chernihiv
Desna Chernihiv